The Paper Art Museum is a museum in Seoul, South Korea.

See also
List of museums in South Korea

External links
Article about the museum
Official site

Art museums and galleries in Seoul